Tereshkovo is a rural locality (a selo) in Dyachenkovskoye Rural Settlement, Bogucharsky District, Voronezh Oblast, Russia. The population was 624 as of 2010. There are 12 streets.

Geography 
Tereshkovo is located 13 km east of Boguchar (the district's administrative centre) by road. Dyachenkovo is the nearest rural locality.

References 

Rural localities in Bogucharsky District